Luis Genaro Castillo Martínez (born May 25, 1993 in Monterrey, Nuevo León) is a Mexican professional footballer who currently plays for Antigua GFC. Luis Genaro Castillo began his career with Tigres UANL moving through the ranks U17, U19, U20 and eventually earning a spot in the first team. After Tigres brought in many star players, Castillo had no room in the team and was loaned out to Jaivas Bravas. After a good season Jaivas Bravas was not able to buy him and was sent back to UANL. UANL loaned him out again this time to Pioneros he was the number 10 and top scorer. A typical medium table team player who needs some playing time in small teams where he got more opportunities.

References

1993 births
Living people
Sportspeople from Monterrey
Mexican footballers
Tigres UANL footballers
Tampico Madero F.C. footballers
Tuxtla F.C. footballers

Association footballers not categorized by position